A Chinese treasure ship (literally "gem ship") is a type of large wooden ship in the fleet of admiral Zheng He, who led seven voyages during the early 15th-century Ming dynasty.

Accounts

Chinese

The History of Ming (1739) credits the first voyage with 62 treasure ships crewed by 27,800 men. A Zheng He era inscription in the Jinghai Temple in Nanjing gave the size of Zheng He ships in 1405 as 2,000 liao (500 tons), but did not give the number of ships.

However, the addition of 255 ships is a case of double accounting according to Edward L. Dreyer, who notes that the Taizong Shilu does not distinguish the order of 250 ships from the treasure ships. As such the first fleet would have been around 250 ships including the treasure ships.

The second voyage consisted of 249 ships. The Jinghai Temple inscription gave the ship dimensions in 1409 as 1500 liao (375 tons).

According to the Xingcha Shenglan (1436), the third voyage consisted of 48 treasure ships, not including other ships.

The Xingcha Shenglan states that the fourth voyage consisted of 63 treasure ships crewed by 27,670 men.

There are no sources for number of ships or men for the fifth and sixth voyages.

According to the Liujiagang and Changle Inscriptions, the seventh voyage had "more than a hundred large ships".

Yemen
The most contemporary non-Chinese record of the expeditions is an untitled and anonymous annalistic account of the then-ruling Rasūlid dynasty of Yemen, compiled in the years 1439–1440. It reports the arrival of Chinese ships in 1419, 1423, and 1432, which approximately correspond to Zheng He's fifth, sixth, and seventh voyages. The 1419 arrival is described thus:

The later Yemeni historian, Ibn al-Daybaʿ (1461–1537), writes:

Mamluks
Mamluk historian Ibn Taghribirdi (1411–1470) writes:

Niccolò de' Conti 
Niccolò de' Conti (–1469), a contemporary of Zheng He, was also an eyewitness of Chinese ships in Southeast Asia, claiming to have seen five-masted junks of about 2000 tons* burthen:

 Other translations of the passage give the size as a 2000 butts, which would be around a 1000 tons, a butt being half a ton. Christopher Wake noted that the transcription of the unit is actually vegetes, that is Venetian butt, and estimated a burthen of 1300 tons. The ship of Conti may have been a Burmese or Indonesian jong.

Song and Yuan junks 

Although active prior to the treasure voyages, both Marco Polo (1254–1325) and Ibn Battuta (1304–1369) attest to large multi-masted ships carrying 500 to 1000 passengers in Chinese waters. The large ships (up to 5,000 liao or 1520–1860 tons burden) would carry 500–600 men, and the second class (1,000–2,000 liao) would carry 200–300 men. Unlike Ming treasure ships, Song and Yuan great junks were propelled by oars, and have with them smaller junks, probably for maneuvering aids. Large size could be a disadvantage for shallow harbors of southern seas, and the presence of numerous reefs exacerbates this.

Marco Polo

Ibn Battuta

Description

Taizong Shilu
The most contemporary accounts of the treasure ships come from the Taizong Shilu, which contains 24 notices from 1403 to 1419 for the construction of ships at several locations.

On 4 September 1403, 200 "seagoing transport ships" were ordered from the Capital Guards in Nanjing.

On 1 March 1404, 50 "seagoing ships" were ordered from the Capital Guards.

In 1407, 249 vessels were ordered "to be prepared for embassies to the several countries of the Western Ocean".

On 14 February 1408, 48 treasure ships were ordered from the Ministry of Works in Nanjing. This is the only contemporary account containing references to both treasure ships and a specific place of construction. Coincidentally, the only physical evidence of treasure ships comes from Nanjing.

On 2 October 1419, 41 treasure ships were ordered without disclosing the specific builders involved.

Longjiang Chuanchang Zhi
's Longjiang Chuanchang Zhi (1553), also known as the Record of the Dragon River Shipyard, notes that the plans for the treasure ships had vanished from the ship yard in which they were built.

Sanbao Taijian Xia Xiyang Ji Tongsu Yanyi
According to 's 1597 novel Sanbao Taijian Xia Xiyang Ji Tongsu Yanyi (Eunuch Sanbao Western Records Popular Romance), the treasure fleet consisted of five distinct classes of ships:

Edward L. Dreyer claims that Luo Maodeng's novel is unsuitable as historical evidence. The novel contains a number of fantasy element; for example the ships were "constructed with divine help by the immortal Lu Ban". Scholars have worked, however, to distinguish the fictional elements from those that the author had access to but have subsequently been lost, including both written and oral sources.

Dimensions and size

Contemporary descriptions
The contemporary inscription of Zheng He's ships in the Jinghai temple (靜海寺—Jìng hǎi sì) inscription in Nanjing gives sizes of 2,000 liao (500 tons) and 1,500 liao (275 tons), which are far too low than would be implied by a ship of 444 chi (450 ft) given by the History of Ming. In addition, in the contemporary account of Zheng He's 7th voyage by Gong Zhen, he said it took 200 to 300 men to handle Zheng He's ships. Ming minister Song Li indicated a ratio of 1 man per 2.5 tons of cargo, which would imply Zheng He's ships were 500 to 750 tons.

The inscription on the tomb of Hong Bao, an official in Zheng He's fleet, mentions the construction of a 5,000 liao displacement ship.

44 zhang ship

History of Ming
According to the History of Ming (Ming shi—明史), completed in 1739, the treasure ships were 44 zhang, 4 chi, i.e. 444 chi in length, and had a beam of 18 zhang. The dimensions of ships are no coincidence. The number "4" has numerological significance as a symbol of the 4 cardinal directions, 4 seasons, and 4 virtues. The number 4 was an auspicious association for treasure ships. These dimensions first appeared in a novel published in 1597, more than a century and a half after Zheng He's voyages. The 3 contemporary accounts of Zheng He's voyages do not have the ship dimensions.

The zhang was fixed at 141 inches in the 19th century, making the chi 14.1 inches. However the common Ming value for chi was 12.2 inches and the value fluctuated depending on region. The Ministry of Works used a chi of 12.1 inches while the Jiangsu builders used a chi of 13.3 inches. Some of the ships in the treasure fleet, but not the treasure ships, were built in Fujian, where the chi was 10.4 to 11 inches. Assuming a range of 10.5 to 12 inches for each chi, the dimensions of the treasure ships as recorded by the History of Ming would have been between 385 by 157.5 feet and 440 by 180 feet (117.5 by 48 metres, and 134 by 55 metres). Louise Levathes estimates that it had a maximum size of 110–124 m (390–408 feet) long and 49–51 m (160–166 feet) wide instead, taking 1 chi as 10.53–11.037 inches.

American historian Edward L. Dreyer is in broad agreement with Needham's views.

Modern estimates
Guan Jincheng (1947) proposed a much more modest size of 20 zhang long by 2.4 zhang wide (204 ft by 25.5 ft or 62.2 m by 7.8 m). Xin Yuan'ou, a shipbuilding engineer and professor of the history of science at Shanghai Jiao Tong University, argues on engineering grounds that it is highly unlikely that Zheng He's treasure ships were 450 ft long, and suggests that they were probably closer to 200–250 ft (61–76 m) in length. Hsu Yun-Ts'iao does not agree with Xin Yuan'ou: Estimating the size of a 2,000 liao ship with the Treatise of the Longjiang shipyard (龙江船厂志—lóng jiāng chuánchǎng zhì) at Nanking, the size is as follows: LOA , bottom's hull length , overhanging "tail" length , front depth , front width , midhull depth , midhull width , tail depth , tail width , and the length to width ratio is 7:1. Dionisius A. Agius (2008) estimated a size of 200–250 ft (60.96 m–76.2 m) and maximum weight of 700 tons. Zheng Ming believes that the "Heavenly Princess Classics" depict 2,000 liao ships.

André Wegener Sleeswyk extrapolated the size of liao (料 — material) by deducing the data from mid-16th century Chinese river junks. He suggested that the 2,000 liao ships were bao chuan (treasure ship), while the 1,500 liao ships were ma chuan (horse ship). In his calculations, the treasure ships would have had a length of 52.5 m, a width of 9.89 m, and a height of 4.71 m. The horse ships would have a length of 46.63 m, a width of 8.8 m, and a height of 4.19 m. He estimated it using an assumed displacement of 3100 tons.

One explanation for the colossal size of the 44 zhang treasure ships, if in fact built, was that they were only for a display of imperial power by the emperor and imperial bureaucrats on the Yangtze River when on court business, including when reviewing Zheng He's actual expedition fleet. The Yangtze River, with its calmer waters, may have been navigable for such large but unseaworthy ships. Zheng He would not have had the privilege in rank to command the largest of these ships. Some of the largest ships of Zheng He's fleet were the 6 masted 2000-liao ships. This would give burthen of 500 tons and a displacement tonnage of about 800 tons. Because they were built and based in Nanjing, and repeatedly sailed along the Yangtze river (including in winter, when the water is low), their draught cannot exceed 7–7.5 m. It is also known that Zheng He's fleet visited Palembang in Sumatra, where they needed to cross the Musi river. It is unknown whether Zheng He's ships sailed as far as Palembang, or whether they waited on the shore in the Bangka Strait while the smaller ships sailed at Musi; but at least the draught of the ship that reaches Palembang should not be more than 6 m.

Xin Yuan'ou argued that Zheng He's ships could not have been as large as recorded in the History of Ming. based on the following reasons:

 Ships of the dimensions given in the Ming shi would have been 15,000–20,000 tons according to his calculations, exceeding a natural limit to the size of a wooden ocean-going ship of about 7,000 tons displacement.
 With the benefit of modern technology it would be difficult to manufacture a wooden ship of 10,000 tons, let alone one that was 1.5–2 times that size. It was only when ships began to be built of iron in the 1860s that they could exceed 10,000 tons.
 Watertight compartments characteristic of traditional Chinese ships tended to make the vessels transversely strong but longitudinally weak.
 A ship of these dimensions would need masts that were 100 metres tall. Several timbers would have to be joined vertically. As a single tree trunk would not be large enough in diameter to support such mast, multiple timbers would need to be combined at the base as well. No evidence that China had the type of joining materials necessary to accomplish these tasks.
 A ship with 9 masts would be unable to resist the combined strength and force of such huge sails, she would not be able to cope with strong wind and would break.
 It took four centuries (from the Renaissance era to the early premodern era) for Western ships to increase in size from 1500 to 5000 tons displacement. For Chinese ships to have reached three or four times this size in just two years (from Emperor Yongle's accession in 1403 to the launch of the first expedition in 1405) was unlikely.
 200–300 sailor as mentioned by Gong Zhen could not have managed a 20,000 tons ship. According to Xin, a ship of such size would have a complement of 8,000 men.

From the comments of modern scholars on Medieval Chinese accounts and reports, it is apparent that a ship had a natural limit to her size, going beyond, would have made her structurally unsafe as well as causing a considerable loss of maneuverability, something the Spanish Armada ships famously experienced. Beyond a certain size (about 300 feet or 91.44 m in length) a wooden ship is structurally unsafe. It was not until the mid to late 19th century that the length of the largest western wooden ship began to exceed 100 meters, even this was done using modern industrial tools and iron parts.

Measurement conversion
It is also possible that the measure of zhang (丈) used in the conversions was mistaken. Seventeenth-century Ming records state that the European East Indiamen and galleons were 30, 40, 50, and 60 zhang (90, 120, 150, and 180 m) in length. The length of a Dutch ship recorded in the History of Ming was 30 zhang. If the zhang is taken to be 3.2 m, the Dutch ship would be 96 m long. Also, the Dutch Hongyi cannon is recorded to be more than 2 zhang (6.4 m) long. A comparative study by Hu Xiaowei (2018) concluded that 1 zhang would be equal to 1.5–1.6 m, this means the Dutch ship would be 45–48 m long and the cannon would be 3–3.2 m long. It is known that the measuring unit during the Ming era was not unified: A measurement of East and West Pagoda in Quanzhou resulted in a zhang unit of 2.5–2.56 m. According to Chen Cunren, one zhang in the Ming Dynasty is only half a zhang in modern times.

5,000 liao ship
In June 2010, a new inscription was found in Hong Bao's tomb, confirming the existence of the Ming dynasty's 5,000 liao ship. Taking the liao to be 500 lbs, that would be 1,250 tons burthen. The 5,000 liao ship may have been used as the flagship but the number of ships was relatively small. Wake argued that the 5,000 liao ships were not used until after the 3rd voyage, when the voyages were extended beyond India. Xi Longfei identified that the word "treasure ship", which would refer to the 44 zhang ship, appeared for the first time in the 6th year of Yongle. This large ship was too late to be used for the third voyage, so it appeared for the first time during the 4th voyage, and was recorded by Ma Huan. Judging from the three images from the Ming era, the largest ships had 3–4 main masts and 2–3 auxiliary masts.

Structure 

The keel consisted of wooden beams bound together with iron hoops. In stormy weather, holes in the prow would partially fill with water when the ship pitched forward, thus lessening the violent turbulence caused by waves. Treasure ships also used floating anchors cast off the sides of the ship in order to increase stability. The stern had two 2.5 m (8 foot) iron anchors weighing over a thousand pounds each, used for mooring offshore. Like many Chinese anchors, these had four flukes set at a sharp angle against the main shaft. Watertight compartments were also used to add strength to the treasure ships. The ships also had a balanced rudder which could be raised and lowered, creating additional stability like an extra keel. The balanced rudder placed as much of the rudder forward of the stern post as behind it, making such large ships easier to steer. Unlike a typical fuchuan warship, the treasure ships had nine staggered masts and twelve square sails, increasing its speed. Treasure ships also had 24 cast-bronze cannons with a maximum range of 240 to 275 m (800–900 feet). However, treasure ships were considered luxury ships rather than warships. As such, they lacked the fuchuan's raised platforms or extended planks used for battle.

Non-gunpowder weapons on Zheng He's vessels seems to be bows. For gunpowder weapons, they carried bombards (albeit shorter than Portuguese bombards) and various kind of hand cannons, such as can be found on early 15th century Bakau shipwreck. Comparing with Penglai wrecks, the fleet may have carried cannons with bowl-shaped muzzle (which dates back to late Yuan dynasty), and iron cannons with several rings on their muzzle (in the wrecks they are 76 and 73 cm long, weighing 110 and 74 kg), which according to Tang Zhiba, a typical of early Ming iron cannon. They may also carry incendiary bombs (quicklime bottles). Girolamo Sernigi (1499) gives an account of the armament of what possibly the Chinese vessels:
It is now about 80 years since there arrived in this city of Chalicut certain vessels of white Christians, who wore their hair long like Germans, and had no beards except around the mouth, such as are worn at Constantinople by cavaliers and courtiers. They landed, wearing a cuirass, helmet, and visor, and carrying a certain weapon [sword] attached to a spear. Their vessels are armed with bombards, shorter than those in use with us. Once every two years they return with 20 or 25 vessels. They are unable to tell what people they are, nor what merchandise they bring to this city, save that it includes very fine linen-cloth and brass-ware. They load spices. Their vessels have four masts like those of Spain. If they were Germans it seems to me that we should have had some notice about them; possibly they may be Russians if they have a port there. On the arrival of the captain we may learn who these people are, for the Italian-speaking pilot, who was given him by the Moorish king, and whom he took away contrary to his inclinations, is with him, and may be able to tell.— Girolamo Sernigi (1499) about the then-unknown Chinese visitors

Physical evidence

From 2003 to 2004, the Treasure Shipyard was excavated in northwestern Nanjing (the former capital of the Ming Dynasty), near the Yangtze River. Despite the site being referred to as the "Longjiang Treasure Shipyard" (龍江寶船廠—lóng jiāng bǎo chuánchǎng) in the official names, the site is distinct from the actual Longjiang Shipyard, which was located on a different site and produced different types of ships. The Treasure Shipyard, where Zheng He's fleet were believed to have been built in the Ming Dynasty, once consisted of thirteen basins (based on a 1944 map), most of which have now been covered by the construction of buildings in the 20th century. The basins are believed to have been connected to the Yangtze via a series of gates. Three long basins survive, each with wooden structures inside them that were interpreted to be frames for the ships to be built on. While they were long enough to accommodate the largest claimed Zheng He treasure ship, they were not wide enough to fit even a ship half the claimed size. Other remains of ships in the site indicate that the ships were only slightly larger than the frames that supported them. Moreover, the basin structures were grouped into clusters with large gaps between them, if each cluster was interpreted as a ship framework, then the largest ship would not exceed  at most, probably less.

In 1957, a large 11-meter-long rudder shaft was discovered during excavations at the Treasure shipyards. The rudder blade, which did not survive, was attached to a 6-meter section of the axis. According to Chinese archaeologists, the area of ​​the rudder was approximately 42.5 m², and the length of the ship to which it belonged was estimated at 149–166 meters. However, such use of this piece of archeological evidence rests upon supposing proportions between the rudder and the length of the ship, which have also been the object of intense contestation: That length was estimated using steel, engine-driven ship as the reference.

Speed
The treasure ships were different in size, but not in speed.

As historians note, these speeds were relatively low by the standards of later European sailing fleets, even in comparison with ship of the line, which were built with an emphasis on armament rather than speed.

Replica
A  copy of a treasure ship was announced in 2006 to be completed in time for the 2008 Olympic Games. However, the copy was still under construction in Nanjing in 2010. A new date of completion was set for 2013; when this dateline failed to be met in 2014, the project was built for 4 years.

See also
List of world's largest wooden ships
Jong (ship), Javanese ship, those used by Majapahit were larger than baochuan
Grace Dieu (ship), English flagship of Henry V, about the same size as baochuan
Ancient Chinese wooden architecture
Pagoda of Fogong Temple

Notes

References

Citations

Sources

Further reading 

Traditions and Encounters - A Global Perspective on the Past by Bentley and Ziegler.

Ships of China
Naval ships of China
15th-century ships
Exploration ships
Treasure voyages
Four-masted ships
Six-masted ships
Seven-masted ships